Mladen Grdović (born 28 July 1958) is a Croatian pop singer.

Biography
Originally from the city of Zadar, he began to start singing in his hometown of Zadar, he is a well-known author of many articles in Croatia. Only in Croatia, in the opus of his career he participated in the 40-odd of them. In addition to his solo performances, he has collaborated with other famous singers such as Bepo Matešić. He has released several albums, which sold 2.5 million copies. He has held a number of concerts and abroad. His songs are very popular in Croatia. He is especially known for his song 'Dalmatinac'.

Personal life
He was married with several women. He has one child, daughter Sara. He currently lives in the city of Zadar.

Discography
Grdović was the author of several songs for Marina Tomašević, at her 1992 album Šarmer i skitnica and the 1994 Nedjelja popodne.

Standalone albums:
 1996 - Nije U Soldima Sve
 2000 - Kada se ljubav u vino pretvori
 2002 - I za dušu i za tilo
 2006 - E, da mi je vratit vrime
 2010 - Najljepse Ljubavne Pjesme
 2012 - Za tebe živim ja
 2014 - Samo More To Zna
 2016 - Nek' Se Cuje Pisma S Jadrana

References

1958 births
Living people
20th-century Croatian male singers
Croatian pop singers
Musicians from Zadar
21st-century Croatian male singers